Apantesis phalerata, the harnessed tiger moth, is a moth of the family Erebidae. The species was first described by Thaddeus William Harris in 1841. It is found in North America from Ontario, Quebec and Maine to Florida, west to Texas, north to South Dakota.

The moths fly from April to September depending on the location.

The larvae feed on Trifolium, Spartina, Taraxacum, and Plantago species, as well as other low-growing plants.

On top of all of this, its caterpillar hosts include clover, corn, dandelion, plantain, and other plants. As a group, tiger moth caterpillars feed on a wide range of grasses, garden crops, shrubs, and trees.
Like all butterflies and moths, harnessed tiger moths undergo a complete metamorphosis, with four life cycle stages: egg, larva (caterpillar), pupa, and adult. The cocoon is constructed mostly from larval hairs, making for a rather fuzzy pupal case.

Many tiger moths wear bright colors, which may serve to warn predators that they'd be an unpalatable meal. However, the nocturnal tiger moths are also hunted by bats, which find their prey using echolocation rather than sight.

References

External links
butterfliesandmoths entry

Moths described in 1841
Arctiina
Moths of North America